The Harrison E. Johnson Memorial Stakes is an American Thoroughbred horse race held annually in March at Laurel Park Racecourse in Laurel, Maryland. It is open to three-year-olds and up and is run at  miles (nine furlongs) on the dirt. An ungraded stakes race, it offers a purse of $100,000. The stake will run this year on Saturday, March 17, 2018.

The race was named in honor of African-American trainer Harrison E. Johnson, a Maryland-based trainer who died in 1985 at age 45 in a plane crash along with George F. Griffith while flying from Saratoga Race Course in upstate New York to Virginia. Johnson was piloting the plane. The native of Adelphi, Maryland, had been a trainer since the spring of 1969. His best race horse was Gutsy O'Shay, winner of the 1973 Hopeful Stakes at Saratoga. That gelding was named Maryland-bred two-year-old champion in 1973.

Records 

Speed record: 
  miles - 1:48.60 - Ibex   (1993)
  miles - 1:55.80 - Big Rut  (1998) & Super Memory   (1995)

Most wins by an horse:
 2 - Due North   (1990 & 1991)

Most wins by a jockey:
 4 - Edgar Prado    (1990, 1993, 1996 & 1997)

Most wins by a trainer:
 2 - H. Graham Motion    (2008 & 2009)
 2 - Katherine M. Voss   (1990 & 1991)

Winners of the Harrison E. Johnson Memorial Stakes

See also 
 Harrison E. Johnson Memorial Handicap top three finishers
 Laurel Park Racecourse

References

External links
 Laurel Park website

Recurring events established in 1986
Laurel Park Racecourse
Horse races in Maryland
Recurring sporting events established in 1986
1986 establishments in Maryland